Ruffin Hamilton III is a former linebacker in the National Football League.

Biography
Hamilton was born on March 2, 1971, in Detroit, Michigan.

Career
Hamilton was drafted by the Green Bay Packers in the sixth round of the 1994 NFL Draft and spent the 1994 NFL season with the team. After two years away from the NFL, he spent three seasons with the Atlanta Falcons.

He played at the collegiate level at Tulane University. He also was a guard in basketball during his time there.

See also
List of Green Bay Packers players

References

Players of American football from Detroit
Green Bay Packers players
Atlanta Falcons players
American football linebackers
Tulane Green Wave football players
1971 births
Living people
People from Zachary, Louisiana
Players of American football from Louisiana
Sportspeople from East Baton Rouge Parish, Louisiana